Brenot is a surname.  Notable people with the surname include:

 Maurice Brenot (1894–1964), Canadian ice hockey player
 Paul Brenot (1880–1967), French engineer and industrialist
 Pierre-Laurent Brenot (1913–1998), French painter